Derek Sneddon (born 27 July 1982) is a Scottish speedway rider.

Career
Born in Falkirk, Sneddon began his professional speedway career in 1998 riding in a single match for Hull Vikings. He had one off rides for Linlithgow Lightning and the Isle of Wight Islanders in 1999, before moving on to Ashfield Giants and Edinburgh Monarchs in 2000. He rode for Newcastle Diamonds in 2002 and returned to the Monarchs in 2003 but suffered a broken femur in a crash early in the season. After regaining his fitness he rode in the Conference League with the Armadale Devils in 2004 and 2005, winning the Conference Trophy in 2005, before returning to the Monarchs team in 2006. He spent three successive seasons with Edinburgh, being named team captain in 2007, and winning the Premier League Championship, play-offs, and Premier Trophy in 2008. In 2009 he moved on to Newcastle Diamonds, spending three seasons there before returning to the Edinburgh team in 2012. In 2013 he again took over the team captaincy and was granted a testimonial year. Sneddon was part of the Monarchs team that won the Premier League Four-Team Championship at Peterborough in July 2013.

References

1982 births
Living people
Scottish motorcycle racers
Scottish speedway riders
British speedway riders
Linlithgow Lightning riders
Isle of Wight Islanders riders
Ashfield Giants riders
Edinburgh Monarchs riders
Armadale Devils riders
Newcastle Diamonds riders